Naru Island may refer to

Naru Island (Japan)
Naru Island (Solomon Islands)